Arajet S.A. is an ultra low-cost startup airline based in Santo Domingo, Dominican Republic.

Operations began on the 15th of September, 2022, with a flight to Barranquilla, Colombia.

History

Early operations

In late 2014, Dominican Wings received its air operator's certificate from the Dominican Republic's civil aviation authority and planned to offer charter flights between the Dominican Republic to Mexico, Trinidad and Tobago and Argentina for and on behalf of tour operators. Its first aircraft, an Airbus A320-200, was delivered on May 3, 2015.

On June 28, 2017, Avion Express announced that it has sold its 65% stake in Dominican Wings to the President of the company, Mr. Victor Pacheco who took complete control of the airline.

Rebrand
In early 2018, it was announced that the airline had transitioned from charter operations to scheduled ultra low-cost flights. The airline stated it had invested $60 million into its relaunch as an ultra-low-cost carrier.

In September 2021, founder Victor Pacheco Mendez, along with the co-founder Mike Powell, announced it would rebrand the airline to Arajet and would operate as a low-cost carrier offering flights throughout the Caribbean and the Americas.

The Junta de Aviación Civil (JAC) approved the request to amend the Certificate of Economic Authorization (CAE) number 25, issued to AraJet, to include 30 new routes and also authorizes the exploitation of regular and non-scheduled air transport services of passengers and cargo, in international operations, from the Dominican Republic to the United States, Cuba, Colombia, Costa Rica, Kingdom of the Netherlands, United Mexican States, Panama, Aruba, French Republic, Guatemala, Republic of Peru, Haiti, Canada and Trinidad and Tobago in November 2021 during its plenary session.

The Instituto Dominicano de Aviacion Civil (IDAC), in collaboration with Dominican carrier Arajet, achieved the certification of two Dominican inspectors at Boeing's facilities to be able to inspect the operations of Boeing-type aircraft in December 2021. Pico Duarte was the company's first aircraft, a Boeing 737 MAX 8, named after the Caribbean's highest mountainous elevation and a nature reserves in the Dominican Republic, completed its painting process In February 2022. Registered HI-1026, arrived at Las Américas International Airport on March 3, 2022.

On March 14, 2022, Arajet was officially launched, along with the President of the Dominican Republic Luis Abinader, who announced that the country was in the process of having a Dominican representative airline with a majority of Dominican capital. In the same event, Boeing announced an order of 20 Boeing 737 MAX 200 (with options for 15 more aircraft in the future) by the airline, becoming the first Caribbean operator of the type.

During the ceremony it was announced that Arajet S.A. is funded by one of the world's largest private multi-asset alternative investment firms, Bain Capital, as well as Griffin Global Asset Management ("Griffin"), a commercial aircraft leasing and alternative asset management company.

Destinations

AraJet plans to fly from the Dominican Republic to the United States, Cuba, Puerto Rico, Costa Rica, Panama, Aruba, Guadeloupe, Guatemala, Peru, Haiti, Canada, El Salvador, and Jamaica.

Initially, they are scheduled to serve the following destinations from its base in Santo Domingo:

In regards to flight to the United States, the airline has requested authorization to the US Department of Transportation to start operating scheduled passenger services to San Juan, Miami and New York by fall 2023.

Fleet

Current fleet
, the Arajet fleet consists of the following aircraft:

Former fleet
As Dominican Wings, the company consisted of the following aircraft:

See also
List of airlines of the Dominican Republic

References

Airlines of the Dominican Republic
Airlines established in 2014
2014 establishments in the Dominican Republic
Low-cost carriers